The Shropshire, Worcestershire and Staffordshire Electric Power Company was an electricity generating and supply organisation that operated in the West Midlands and South Wales. It was established in 1903 and was dissolved as a consequence of the nationalisation of the British electricity supply industry in 1948.

History 
The Shropshire and Worcestershire Electric Power Company was established in 1903 under the terms of the Shropshire and Worcestershire Electric Power Act 1903. Further Acts were obtained in 1905, 1906, 1914, 1916, 1918 and 1923. The name was changed to include Staffordshire in 1905. The company's aim was to supply electrical energy to authorised undertakings and to others requiring a supply of power. Its area of supply included Shropshire, Worcestershire and part of Staffordshire. This was later extended by acquisitions to include Herefordshire, Gloucestershire and Oxfordshire.

The company intended to build its own generating stations but initially purchased the existing stations of smaller electricity undertakings. These included the following (with the original owner, construction and purchase dates):

 Smethwick power station, Birmingham and Midland Tramways Limited, built 1904, purchased 1908, closed 1949
 Dudley power station, Dudley Corporation, built 1899, purchased 1914, closed late 1930s
 Kidderminster power station, Kidderminster and District Electric Lighting and Traction Company Limited, built 1898, purchased 1919, closed late 1920s
 Redditch power station, Redditch Urban District Council, built 1900, purchased 1924, closed early 1930s
 Hereford power station, Hereford Corporation, built 1899, purchased 1929, closed 1939

Stourport power station 
During the First World War the two major undertakings in the Midlands, the Shropshire Company and the Birmingham Corporation, proposed to build two large power stations to meet their joint needs. These would be the 30 MW Netchells station and the 45 MW Stourport power station. However, the proposal failed on the question of financing. The Shropshire Company eventually built Stourport power station which was commissioned in 1927. This enabled the smaller, less efficient, stations at Dudley, Kidderminster and Redditch to be closed.

Developments in the 1930s 
The Shropshire Company became part of the Edmundsons Electricity Corporation Limited which by 1931 was itself part of the Greater London and Counties Trust.

The Shropshire Company continued to purchase, or obtain a controlling interest in, further electricity undertakings and closed the power stations as a bulk supply was available from its network. These included the smaller power stations at:

 Blockley power station, Blockley Electric Lighting and Manufacturing Company, built 1888, purchased 1931, closed ‘soon after’
 Church Stretton power station, Church Stretton Electric Supply Company Limited, built 1904, purchased 1929, closed ‘soon after’
 Fladbury power station, Fladbury Electric Light and Power Company Limited, built 1900, purchased 1925, closed 1925
 Ledbury power station, Ledbury Electric Supply Company Limited, built 1913, purchased 1930, closed 1930
 Ludlow power station, Ludlow Electric Light Company Limited, built 1906, purchased 1927, closed 1929
 Ross-on-Wye power station, Ross Electric Light and Power Company Limited, built 1902, purchased 1930s
 Tewkesbury power station, Tewkesbury Electric Light Company Limited, built 1909, purchased 1930s

In addition to the above towns the company supplied electricity to Bewdley, Bromsgrove, Droitwich, Evesham, Halesowen and Oldbury.

In 1937 the Company purchased a majority shareholding in the South Wales Electric Power Company.

Nationalisation 
The Shropshire, Worcestershire and Staffordshire Electric Power Company was abolished on 31 March 1948 under the terms of the Electricity Act 1947 which nationalised the British electricity supply industry. The company's power stations and electricity transmission systems were vested in the British Electricity Authority. The local distribution systems and the electricity sales functions were vested in the Midlands Electricity Board (MEB).

Key people 
The Chairmen of the company included:

 William Leonard Madgen 1921
 Emile Garcke 1923–30
 F. Massingberd Rogers 1930–33
 Sir Holberry Mensforth 1933–36
 Brigadier-General Wade H. Hayes 1936
 Sir Thomas Royden 1936–43 

The directors of the company in 1921 were:

 William Leonard Madgen (Chairman and Managing Director)
 Clarence Shirreff Hilton
 Emile Garcke
 James Albert Lycett
 Brenchley Barrett Kingsford

The registered office was at 88 Kingsway, London.

Generating plant 
Technical details of the Shropshire Company's power stations, and later constituent power stations, were as follows:

By 1946 the Shropshire Company operated only Stourport A power station. The details for 1946 were:

 Generating capacity: 182.25 MW
 Electricity sold: 714,526 MWh
 Maximum load: 178,164 kW
 Load factor: 45.8%
 Thermal efficiency: 22.34%

Following nationalisation the British Electricity Authority built Stourport B station (1950–54).This had a generating capacity of 120 MW.

Operations 
The growth of the Shropshire Company's business is shown in the general trend of an increase in the amount of electricity sold and the connected load.

The combined electricity output from Dudley, Kidderminster and Smethwick power stations was used for the following purposes:

The amount of electricity generated and the revenue from sales in 1923 were as shown:

See also 
List of pre-nationalisation UK electric power companies

Timeline of the UK electricity supply industry

List of power stations in England

References 

Defunct electric power companies of the United Kingdom
Electric power companies of England
Electric power infrastructure in England
Energy companies disestablished in 1948